Saints Peter and Paul Cathedral (Petropavlovsky Cathedral) is a Russian Orthodox church in Kazan (Tatarstan). It is one of the most famous churches in Naryshkin Baroque.

The temple is consecrated in honour of heavenly Tsar Peter I of Russia patron.

Saints Peter and Paul Cathedral is built in 1722. Constructing were operated merchant Ivan Afanasievich Mikhlyaev the head imperial factories in Kazan. Most likely, oriental-like cathedral and its bell tower were constructed by in common Moscow and Kazan masters.

External links
 Saints Peter and Paul Cathedral in the Kazan Eparchia site

Churches in Kazan
Russian Orthodox cathedrals in Russia
Churches completed in 1722
1722 establishments in the Russian Empire
Cultural heritage monuments of federal significance in Tatarstan